Mortoniodendron is a genus of flowering plants belonging to the family Malvaceae.

Its native range is southern Mexico to Colombia. It is also found in Costa Rica, El Salvador, Guatemala, Honduras, Mexico, Nicaragua and Panamá. Fossils indicate that it has been in its present range since the Miocene. Eocene-aged pollen from Europe and Southern China attributable to the genus indicate a wider distribution in the Northern Hemisphere in the past.
 
The genus name of Mortoniodendron is in honour of Conrad Vernon Morton (1905–1972), an American botanist who did notable writings on Ferns. 
It was first described and published in Publ. Field Mus. Nat. Hist., Bot. Series 17 on page 411 in 1938.

Known species
According to Kew:
Mortoniodendron abelianum 
Mortoniodendron anisophyllum 
Mortoniodendron apetalum 
Mortoniodendron cauliflorum 
Mortoniodendron costaricense 
Mortoniodendron guatemalense 
Mortoniodendron hirsutum 
Mortoniodendron longipedunculatum 
Mortoniodendron membranaceum 
Mortoniodendron ocotense 
Mortoniodendron palaciosii 
Mortoniodendron pentagonum 
Mortoniodendron ruizii 
Mortoniodendron sulcatum 
Mortoniodendron uxpanapense 
Mortoniodendron vestitum

References

Tilioideae
Malvaceae genera
Plants described in 1938
Flora of Mexico
Flora of Central America
Flora of Colombia